Svarthornbotnen Cirque is a large cirque just northeast of Store Svarthorn Peak in the Mittlere Petermann Range, Wohlthat Mountains in Antarctica.  Discovered and plotted from air photos by German Antarctic Expedition, 1938–39. Replotted by Norwegian Antarctic Expedition, 1956–60, and named Svarthornbotnen (the black peak cirque).

References

External links

Cirques of Queen Maud Land
Princess Astrid Coast